Oren Peli (born January 21, 1970) is an Israeli film director, producer and screenwriter, known for directing the 2007 film Paranormal Activity.

Early life
Peli was born in Ramat Gan, Israel, to a Jewish family. At the age of 19, he moved to the United States.

Career
Peli began as a computer software programmer, and was one of the developers behind Photon Paint, a bitmap graphics program for the Amiga. He is also credited for developing the networking code for the home console versions of Mortal Kombat 3, during his work at Sculptured Software. 

His first film Paranormal Activity was inspired by Peli moving into his first house alone and without family nearby. Peli heard creaks and knocks in the night, which laid the groundwork for a film about a family running around with cameras trying to catch what was going on in the house.

After the success of Paranormal Activity, Peli worked with James Wan and Leigh Whannell to develop Insidious. Peli also produced and wrote the 2012 horror film Chernobyl Diaries, based on the Chernobyl disaster and on his story The Diary of Lawson Oxford. The film followed "a group of friends who, while vacationing in Europe, find themselves stranded in the abandoned city of Prypiat, Ukraine only to discover that they are not alone."

Television
In 2012, The River premiered on ABC, a paranormal/action/horror television series about a group of people on a mission to find a missing TV explorer in the Amazon. Peli co-created the show with Michael R. Perry, who co-wrote Paranormal Activity 2.

Films
Peli is writer and director of Area 51, a story about three friends who want to discover the secrets of the fabled Area 51. Peli is also the producer of all films in the Paranormal Activity franchise and The Lords of Salem.

Filmography

Video games 

 1998: NFL Xtreme (programmer)
 2019: Night Terrors: Bloody Mary (executive producer)

References

External links
 
 

1970 births
Israeli film directors
Israeli film producers
Israeli male screenwriters
Living people
Video game programmers
Jewish American writers
Israeli emigrants to the United States
Israeli male writers
Horror film directors
Israeli Jews
21st-century American Jews